{{DISPLAYTITLE:C21H26NO3}}
The molecular formula C21H26NO3 (molar mass: 340.44 g/mol, exact mass: 340.1913 u) may refer to:

 Mepenzolate
 Methantheline
 Poldine

Molecular formulas